Platina was a railway station on the Walhalla narrow gauge line in Gippsland, Victoria, Australia. The station was opened in 1910, and consisted of a passenger shed and a number of sidings.  The Evans brothers built two lime kilns nearby in 1912, and had their own siding at the station.

In 1944, the railway line between Platina and Walhalla was closed. The lime quarries and kilns ceased operating in 1951, causing the closure of the Erica to Platina railway the following year.

All that exists at the former site of Platina Station is a small shelter and a grassed picnic area. A road overbridge is located at the down end of the station.  The route is now used by the Walhalla Goldfields Rail Trail.  The Walhalla Goldfields Railway have plans to extend the tourist railway to Platina and eventually to Erica.

See also
Walhalla Goldfields Railway

References
Walhalla Goldfields Rail Trail - Trail Description
 Historic Gold Mining Sites in Gippsland Mining Division, Gazetteer: State & Regional Significant Sites, Department of Natural Resources and Environment, February 1998

Disused railway stations in Victoria (Australia)
Lime kilns in Australia
Transport in Gippsland (region)
Shire of Baw Baw
Walhalla railway line